Night Without Sleep is a 1952 American film noir mystery film directed by Roy Ward Baker and starring Gary Merrill, Linda Darnell and Hildegarde Neff.

Plot 
A composer, Richard Morton experiences blackouts and cannot account for his actions. He seems to recall a woman's screams and a conversation with his wife, Emily, but it's all a blur.

Morton goes to see his friend John Harkness and is introduced to a film actress, Julie Bannon, and is attracted to her. He also apparently has made a date with Lisa Muller, who is angry when Morton shows up two hours late. He loses his temper and threatens her.

Julie goes out with Morton and attempts to seduce him, but something in him resists. He returns to Lisa and begins to menace her again, only to suffer another blackout. When he wakes up, Morton is in his own home by himself and isn't sure where he has been or what he has done.

He phones Lisa and learns she is all right. Concerned, he contacts Julie as well, but she also has not been harmed. Morton is glad that his violent temper did not cause him to lose control and that the woman's screams are all in his mind, until he goes to his own bedroom for the night and finds his wife there, dead.

Cast 
 Gary Merrill as Richard Morton
 Linda Darnell as Julie Bannon
 Hildegarde Neff as Lisa Muller
 June Vincent as Emily Morton
 Hugh Beaumont as John Harkness
 Joyce MacKenzie as Laura Harkness
 Donald Randolph as Dr. Clarke

Reception

Critical response 
Film critic Bosley Crowther was caustic in his review of the film, "As hopeless a bout with insomnia as ever you want to endure is pictured in wearying progression in Twentieth Century-Fox's Night Without Sleep, which landed yesterday at the Palace with the Walcott-Marciano fight pictures and eight acts of vaudeville ... Without spark, without inspiration, without intelligence and without suspense, this bleak exercise in morbid mooning moves slowly and barely, if at all."

References

External links 
 
 
 
 

1952 films
American mystery thriller films
American black-and-white films
Film noir
Films directed by Roy Ward Baker
Films scored by Cyril J. Mockridge
20th Century Fox films
1950s mystery thriller films
1950s English-language films
1950s American films